Memecylon royenii is a species of plant in the family Melastomataceae endemic to Sri Lanka.

References

Endemic flora of Sri Lanka
royenii
Vulnerable plants
Taxonomy articles created by Polbot